Matheson House is a historic house in Perth, Ontario, Canada. It was constructed in 1840 for Roderick Matheson, a local merchant and later a member of the Senate of Canada.

A two-storey, five-bay sandstone house of Palladian-inspired design, Matheson House is surrounded by a stone garden wall.  After Roderick Matheson's death in 1873, the house was inherited by Arthur James Matheson, a lawyer and member of the Legislative Assembly of Ontario. After a series of subsequent owners, the house was acquired by the municipality and became the Perth Museum.

The house was designated a National Historic Site of Canada in 1966.

References

Historic house museums in Ontario
Houses in Ontario
Buildings and structures in Lanark County
National Historic Sites in Ontario
Museums in Lanark County
Palladian Revival architecture in Canada
Tourist attractions in Lanark County
Sandstone buildings in Canada
Sandstone houses
Designated heritage properties in Ontario